The 2017 Big Ten Conference women's soccer tournament was the postseason women's soccer tournament for the Big Ten Conference for the 2017 season. It was held from October 29 through November 5, 2017. The seven-match tournament began with first-round matches held at campus sites, before moving to Grand Park in Westfield, Indiana for the semifinals and final. The eight-team single-elimination tournament consisted of three rounds based on seeding from regular-season conference play. Minnesota were the defending champions, but they were eliminated from the 2017 tournament with a 2–0 quarterfinal loss to Wisconsin. The Penn State Nittany Lions won the title with a 2–1 win over the Northwestern Wildcats in the final. The conference tournament title was the seventh for the Penn State women's soccer program and the third for head coach Erica Dambach.

Bracket

Schedule

Quarterfinals

Semifinals

Final

Statistics

Goalscorers 

2 Goals
 Laura Freigang – Penn State

1 Goal
 Maia Cella – Wisconsin
 Michele Chernesky – Northwestern
 Hannah Davison – Northwestern
 Haleigh Echard – Penn State
 Maria Fayeulle – Northwestern
 Eleanor Gabriel – Ohio State
 Nia Harris – Northwestern
 Morgan Kemerling – Iowa
 Lauren Rice – Wisconsin
 Dani Rhodes – Wisconsin
 Sarah Roberts – Ohio State

See also
 2017 Big Ten Conference Men's Soccer Tournament

References

External links
2017 Big Ten Women's Soccer Championship

 
Big Ten Women's Soccer Tournament